Hasan Okan Gültang (born 29 October 1972) is a former Turkish footballer and later football coach.
He played his only cap for Turkey against Israel on 8 March 1995.

Biography
Gültang was the starting keeper in 1993 Mediterranean Games. He was the backup keeper of Rüştü Reçber at 1994 UEFA European Under-21 Football Championship qualification and was the backup of Engin İpekoğlu in UEFA Euro 1996 qualifying.

Honours
 Mediterranean Games: 1993

External links
 Profile at TFF
 Coach profile at TFF

Turkish footballers
Turkey international footballers
Süper Lig players
Gençlerbirliği S.K. footballers
Adanaspor footballers
İstanbulspor footballers
Gaziantepspor footballers
Kayseri Erciyesspor footballers
Afyonkarahisarspor footballers
Association football goalkeepers
Sportspeople from Adana
1972 births
Living people
Turkey under-21 international footballers
Mediterranean Games gold medalists for Turkey
Mediterranean Games medalists in football
Competitors at the 1993 Mediterranean Games